Eight ships of the Royal Navy have borne the name HMS Rocket. Another was planned but never completed:

  was a 4-gun fireship, previously the civilian Busy. She was purchased in 1804 and sold in 1807.
  was an iron paddle tender launched in 1842 and broken up in 1850.
  was a mortar vessel launched in 1855. She was renamed MV20 later that year and was broken up in 1865.
  was an  wooden screw gunboat launched in 1856 and broken up in 1864.
  was a  composite screw gunvessel launched in 1868 and sold in 1888.
  was a  launched in 1894 and sold in 1912.
She was renamed  before being launched in 1913.
  was an  launched in 1916 and sold in 1926.
  was a later R-class destroyer launched in 1942, converted to a Type 15 frigate between 1949 and 1951 and scrapped in 1967.

Royal Navy ship names